The 111th edition of the Paris–Tours cycling classic was held on 8 October 2017. The race was part of the 2017 UCI Europe Tour, ranked as a 1.HC event. Matteo Trentin won in a time of 5hr22'51", two bike lengths ahead of Søren Kragh Andersen. Niki Terpstra was third.

Route
The race started in Brou, 70 km west of Paris, and finished in Tours, in the center-west of France, after 234.5 km of racing.

References

External links
Official website

2017 UCI Europe Tour
Paris–Tours
Paris-Tours
Paris-Tours